The Natural History Museum in Leipzig is a natural history museum in the city of Leipzig, Germany, located at the northwest corner of the Inner City Ring Road. The museum contains the insect collection of Alexander Julius Reichert.

See also 
List of museums in Germany
List of natural history museums

External links
Official website

Leipzig
Museums in Leipzig